Birger Verstraete (born 16 April 1994) is a Belgian professional footballer who plays for Belgian Pro League side Mechelen on loan from Antwerp.

Club career
In 2018–19, he helped Gent reach the final of the 2018–19 Belgian Cup, where they took the lead against Mechelen, before losing 2–1.

On 6 September 2022, Verstraete joined Mechelen on loan.

International career
Verstraete made his Belgium national football team debut on 7 September 2018 in a friendly against Scotland.

References

External links

1994 births
Sportspeople from Ostend
Living people
Association football midfielders
Belgian footballers
Belgium under-21 international footballers
Belgium youth international footballers
Belgium international footballers
Club Brugge KV players
Royal Excel Mouscron players
K.V. Kortrijk players
K.A.A. Gent players
1. FC Köln players
Royal Antwerp F.C. players
K.V. Mechelen players
Belgian Pro League players
Bundesliga players
Regionalliga players
Belgian expatriate footballers
Expatriate footballers in Germany
Belgian expatriate sportspeople in Germany